Lake Coghinas is an artificial lake, in northern Sardinia, Italy, located in the province of Sassari. With a surface of 17.8 km² and a capacity of 254 million cubic metres of water, it is the second largest lake in the region (second only to Lake Omodeo) and one of the major reservoirs in Italy.

The dam, constructed under Fascism in 1924, is 185 metres long and 58 metres wide. It has the function of water supply, but also  it has a hydroelectric power plant.

The lake is the home of a rich ecosystem, and it is become a tourist attraction, around its shores are present a youth hostel, restaurants, a sailing club.

Coghinas
Province of Sassari